Almah or Almeh (plural   , from Arabic:   "to know, be learned")
was the name of a class of courtesans or female entertainers in Egypt, women educated to sing and recite classical poetry and to discourse wittily, connected to the qayna slave singers.
They were educated girls of good social standing, trained in dancing, singing and poetry, present at festivals and entertainments, and hired as mourners at funerals.

The Awalim were first introduced as singers, not dancers-cum-prostitutes, according to Edward William Lane's book, Manner and Costumes of modern Egyptians. Lane additionally wrote that the Almah didn't display herself at all, but sang from behind a screen or from another room at weddings and other respectable festivities. Consequently, the Awalem were not subject to exile in Upper Egypt.

In the 19th century, almeh came to be used as a synonym to all the erotic local dancers who usually came from very poor backgrounds and sometimes contributed in sexual acts in return of money, hence why the traditional erotic dancers of Egypt got all their performances banned in 1834, because they were considered "unclassy". As a result of the ban, all the dancers in modern Egypt became Awalim, which was officially classified as a legal occupation in Egypt.
 
Transliterated into French as almée, the term came to be synonymous with "belly dancer" in European Orientalism of the 19th Century.

Awalim

From the last decades of the 19th century until the 1920s, there were some of the most notable and last "awalim" of Egypt:

 Shooq
 Bamba Kashar
 Chafika Al Qebtiya
 Mounira Al Mahdiya
 Badia Masabni
 Beba Ibrahim
 Nabawiya Al Masryia

References

Egyptian culture
Egyptian dances
Egyptian female dancers
North African culture
Belly dance